The National Conference League (known as the Kingstone Press National Conference League for sponsorship reasons) is the top English amateur rugby league competition in the Rugby Football League pyramid, and as such is the leading amateur rugby league competition in England. Since 2012, the National Conference operates over a summer season in line with the professional game.

History

The league was founded as the BARLA National League for the 1986–87 season with 10 teams: Dudley Hill, Egremont Rangers, Heworth, Leigh Miners Welfare (now Leigh Miners Rangers), Milford Marlins, Millom, Pilkington Recs, West Hull, Wigan St Patrick's and Woolston Rovers. The original NCL concept was one team per town.

The league added a second division in 1989, and expanded to three divisions (now named premier, first and second as opposed to first and second) along with a rebrand to the current name of National Conference League in 1993.

Somewhat confusingly, in the late 1990s and 2000s another major amateur competition was also titled conference: the Rugby League Conference (RLC), which operated a summer season as opposed to the traditional winter season retained by the NCL. The move to a summer season by the NCL in 2012 and a reorganisation by the RFL resulted in a merger of the leagues and the creation of a new NCL 3rd division out of the old RLC National Division, which was replaced by the Conference League South in 2013.

Structure

The National Conference League consists of four divisions. Teams can be promoted and relegated through all four divisions, and teams can also be relegated from Division Three into the regional leagues. For the 2018 season, there are three divisions of 12 teams, whilst the bottom tier consists of 13 teams.

Although it is considered the tier below League 1, teams are not promoted and relegated between the amateur NCL and the professional game, although NCL teams do play in the League 1 Cup and Challenge Cup.

Play-offs
The Premier Division play-offs follows a similar structure to that in the professional game. The Champions are decided in a top six play-off competition. In week 1 of the play-offs, the teams placed 3rd and 6th play each other as do the teams paced 4th and 5th, the winners qualify for the Elimination Semi-Final. In week 2 of the pay-offs, the teams that finished the regular season 1st and second play each other in the Qualifying Semi-Final and takes place on the same weekend. The winner of the Qualifying Semi-Final progresses to the Grand Final while the loser has another opportunity to get to the Grand Final by playing the winners of the Elimination Semi-Final in Week 3 of the play-offs.

The Division One, Division Two and Division Three play-offs are contested by the teams that finished 3rd to 6th during the regular season. The top two teams are promoted automatically. These Play-offs are straightforward knock-out competitions composed of two Semi-Finals, between the teams finishing 3rd and 6th in one and those that finished 4th and 5th on the other, before the winners contest the Final a week later. The winner of the Final is promoted.

Clubs in 2022

Results

Winners

See also

NCL Premier
NCL Division One
NCL Division Two
NCL Division Three
Conference League South

References

External links
 Official website
 BARLA official website
 NCL Founder Member Millom RLFC
 NCL Member Brighouse Rangers RLFC

 
Rugby Football League
BARLA competitions
Rugby league in the United Kingdom
Rugby league competitions in the United Kingdom